The Ballagan Formation is a geologic formation in Scotland and England. It preserves fossils dating back to the early part of the Carboniferous period (Tournaisian – early Visean). Its name comes from the "Ballagan Beds" of Ballagan Glen, near Strathblane, which has a good example of this geological formation.

The Ballagan Formation was historically known as the Cementstone Group, but more recently it has been placed as the middle formation of the Inverclyde Group. This change was motivated by the recognition that the youngest parts of the Devonian Upper Old Red Sandstone (now known as the Kinnesswood Formation) were geologically continuous with the lowest parts of the Lower Carboniferous Calciferous Sandstone Measures (now known as the Ballagan and Clyde Sandstone formations). This interval of Devonian-Carboniferous overlap was named the Inverclyde Group, and the cementstone-rich "drab beds" in the middle of the group were renamed to the Ballagan Formation. In Lothian, the Ballagan Formation is sometimes known as the Tyninghame Formation.

Fossil sites 
Many localities of the Ballagan Formation preserve exceptional fossils. The majority of fossiliferous sites are in the Midland Valley (particularly the Scottish Borders and East Lothian), in the southeast corner of Scotland.

One of the earliest sites to be studied was the fish bed at Foulden, which hosts many well-preserved fish fossils, notably including endemic actinopterygians (ray-finned fish) and the first complete skeleton of a rhizodont. Plants and arthropods also form a significant portion of Foulden fossils. This site and its fish fossils were publicized by E.I. White in 1927, and further excavations were performed by Stan Wood in 1980-1981. The Foulden fish bed was the primary theme for volume 76 of the Transactions of the Royal Society of Edinburgh: Earth Sciences journal, published in 1985.

Willie's Hole, near Chirnside, is another site known for its high quality of preservation. It was initially recognized for its crustacean fossils, forming "shrimp beds" akin to those observed throughout the later Scottish Carboniferous. Willie's Hole has continued to produce well-preserved fossils of arthropods, fish, and partial tetrapod skeletons.

By far the largest exposures of the Ballagan Formation occur along the coastal end cliffs of Burnmouth. Tetrapod, fish, and arthropod fragments are common in several layers at Burnmouth, not just in fine-grained overbank deposits but also coarse river channel conglomerates, an unusual mode of preservation.

Tetrapod fossils have  been found in the vicinity of Tantallon Castle. Additional Midland Valley sites include Crumble Edge (along Whiteadder Water), Coldstream, Cockburnspath, Cove (in Berwickshire), and Whitrope Burn (near Hawick). A few locales in nearby Northumberland, England encompass fossil-bearing outcrops of the Ballagan Formation, such as Berwick-upon-Tweed Barrow Scar (near Alwinton), and a borehole core at Norham.

Some sites are also found along the west coast of Scotland. Auchenreoch Glen, near Dumbarton, was the collection site for the nearly complete type fossil of Pederpes finneyae, which was the oldest named tetrapod of the Carboniferous upon its discovery. Diverse assemblages of fish teeth and other microfossils have been found at Ayrshire and at Hawk's Nib and Mill Hole, on the Isle of Bute.

Paleobiota 
The Ballagan Formation preserves a plethora of tetrapod, fish, and invertebrate fossils, reconstructing one of the most diverse continental ecosystems known from the Tournaisian stage. A variety of plant megafossils and spores are known from the Ballagan Formation.

Tetrapods 
 Aytonerpeton microps
 Diploradus austiumensis
 Koilops herma
 Mesanerpeton woodi
 Ossirarus kierani
 Pederpes finneyae (Whatcheeriidae)
 Perritodus apsconditus
 Tantallognathus woodi
 UMZC 2011.7.2: A small unnamed five-fingered tetrapod similar to Gephyrostegus and Silvanerpeton
 SPW 4165 ("Ribbo"): A large unnamed tetrapod with robust ribs and limbs
 Crassigyrinus-like bone fragments
 An Eogyrinus-like tetrapod scute
 Indeterminate Tetrapoda and Whatcheeriidae fragments.

Fish 
 Acanthodii ("spiny sharks"): Acanthodes ovensi (Acanthodidae), Gyracanthus sp. (Gyracanthidae), and rare indeterminate Climatiiformes. 
 Actinisitia (coelacanths): cf. Rhabdoderma
 Actinopterygii (ray-finned fish): Aetheretmon valentiacum (Strepheoschemidae), Cosmoptychius striatus (Cosmoptychiidae), Phanerosteon ovensi (Carbovelidae), Strepheoschema fouldenensis (Strepheoschemidae), Styracopterus fulcratus (Styracopteridae)
 Chondrichthyes (cartilaginous fish): Ageleodus pectinatus, Cladodus sp. (Ctenacanthiformes?), Cooleyella sp. (Anachronistidae), Deihim sp. (Protacrodontidae), Deltodus tubineus (Cochliodontidae), Harpagofututor sp. (Chondrenchelyidae), Helodus ?simplex (Helodontiformes), Onychoselache (shark fin spines), Platyxystrodus sps. (Chondrenchelyidae), Protacrodus sp. (Protacrodontidae), Whitropus longicalcus (Cochliodontiformes)
 Dipnoans (lungfish): Ballagadus caustrimi, Ballagadus rossi, Coccovedus cellatus, Ctenodus roberti, Ctenodus whitropei, Ctenodus williei, Limanichthys fraseri, Occludus romeri, Uronemus splendens, Xylognathus macrustenus
 Megalichthyidae: ?Megalichthys sp.
 Rhizodonts: cf. Archichthys portlocki, Strepsodus? anculomanensis, cf. Strepsodus sauroides
 Indeterminate Actinopterygii.
 Indeterminate Chondrichthyes, including Helodontidae, Psephodontidae, Cochliodontiformes, Protacrodontidae, Holocephali, Xenacanthiformes, Hybodontiformes, ctenacanths, and Menaspiformes.
 Indeterminate fragments of lungfish and rhizodonts, some estimated up to 3 meters or 10 feet in length

Invertebrates 
 Eumalacostracan crustaceans ("shrimps"): Bairdops elegans (Permimecturidae), Belotelson traquairi (Belotelsonidae), Dithyocaris, Pseudogalathea, Pseudotealliocaris etheridgei, Tealliocaris
 Millipedes: Woodesmus sheari and at least five other millipede taxa, including members of Archipolypoda, Juliformia, and Euphoberiidae
 Xiphosurans (horseshoe crabs): Albalimulus bottoni (Limulidae), Rolfeia fouldenensis (Paleolimulidae)
 Scorpions: Gigantoscorpio cf. willsi (Gigantoscorpionidae), Trachyscorpio squarrosus (Eoscorpiidae) 
 Eurypterids: "Cyrtoctenus" (Hibbertopterus) peachi (Hibbertopteridae)
 Polyurida aenigmatica, an enigmatic worm-like animal initially mistaken for a myriapod
 "Spirorbiform" microconchids, initially mistaken for Spirorbis polychaete worm tubes
 Ostracods
 Bivalves: Modiolus latus (Mytilidae), Naiadites, Schizodus 
 Gastropods
 Brachiopods

See also

 List of fossiliferous stratigraphic units in Scotland

References

 

Carboniferous System of Europe
Carboniferous Scotland
Carboniferous southern paleotropical deposits
Tournaisian